Heteroplexis is a genus of Chinese flowering plants in the family Asteraceae.

 Species
 Heteroplexis impressinervia J.Y.Liang
 Heteroplexis incana J.Y.Liang
 Heteroplexis microcephala Y.L.Chen
 Heteroplexis sericophylla Y.L.Chen
 Heteroplexis vernonioides C.C.Chang

References

Asteraceae genera
Astereae
Flora of China